During World War II, Operation Cold Comfort was a failed SAS raid that began with a parachute drop north of Verona on 17 February 1945. It was later renamed Zombie. 

The 12 man ski team under Capt. Littlejohn, and their equipment were widely scattered in the drop, and thereafter found themselves among hostile locals of essentially German origin. Their mission was to block by landslide the main rail lines through the Brenner Pass, thus having a dramatic effect on German reinforcements moving south.

The men spent most of their time in hiding and attempts to supply and reinforce by air were unsuccessful. Capt. Littlejohn and Corporal Crowley were captured and executed under Hitler’s Commando Order. Eventually on 31 March the situation had worsened to the point exfiltration was ordered.

References
A list of special operations Includes a reference for the exact date of this mission.

Conflicts in 1945
World War II British Commando raids
Deaths by firearm in Italy
Special Air Service
1945 in Italy